The men's lightweight event was part of the weightlifting programme at the 1924 Summer Olympics. The weight class was the second-lightest contested, and allowed weightlifters of up to 67.5 kilograms (148.8 pounds). The competition was held on 22 July 1924.

Results
One hand snatch

One hand clean & jerk

Press

The third try of Johny Grün is mark in the official report as missed, but his best try in the press event is shown as 67.5 kilograms, so it looks like that he was able to clear 67.5 kg also.

Two hand snatch

Two hand clean & jerk

Final standing after the last event:

References

Sources
 official report
 

Lightweight